The 1965 Kilkenny Senior Hurling Championship was the 71st staging of the Kilkenny Senior Hurling Championship since its establishment by the Kilkenny County Board. The championship began on 4 July 1965 and ended on 29 August 1965.

Bennettsbridge were the defending champions.

On 29 August 1965, Mooncoin won the championship after a 2–08 to 1–08 defeat of Bennettsbridge in the final. It was their 12th championship title overall and their first title since 1936. It remains their last championship triumph.

Team changes

To Championship

Promoted from the Kilkenny Junior Hurling Championship
 Young Irelands

From Championship

Regraded to the Kilkenny Junior Hurling Championship
 John Locke's
 Lisdowney

Results

First round

Second round

Semi-finals

Final

References

Kilkenny Senior Hurling Championship
Kilkenny Senior Hurling Championship